Talwan is a village in Punjab near the city of Nurmahal. Nurmahal is a sub tehsil in the district Jalandhar in the Indian state of Punjab.

Talwan town situated on the bank shore of Sutlej river that is the longest of the five rivers that flow through the historic crossroads region of Punjab in northern India and Pakistan. Talwan lies on the Jalandhar-Nurmahal-Talwan Major District Road 82 (MDR 82) of Punjab. The development block for Talwan is Nurmahal.
The nearest railway station to Talwan is Nurmahal railway station at a distance of 8 km. Talwan falls into Dhagara(village)

Notable people from Talwan 
Swami Shraddhanand (Munshiram) who was a freedom fighter, social reformer and founder of Gurukul Kangri, was born in Talwan.

Pin Code & STD codes 
Talwan's pin code & STD Code is 144039 & 01826 respectively.

References 
3. Talwan village Website and other pages https://talwan.art.blog
Cities and towns in Jalandhar district